Vikingen (meaning The Viking in English) is a former Norwegian satirical magazine, published from 1862 to 1947. Among the contributors were the satirical illustrators Olaf Krohn, Andreas Bloch, Gustav Lærum and Olaf Gulbransson.

History and profile

The weekly comic magazine Vikingen was established by printer Henning Tønsberg in Kristiania in 1862. The first issue was published on 4 October 1862. Johan Ludvig Vibe, Johan Schønheyder and Olaf Skavlan were also instrumental in the establishment of the magazine and they worked as editors.

In the beginning the magazine had only 11 subscribers, but the magazine attracted some attention and it soon became an important, if not exactly serious, organ of public debate, humour and satire. Contemporary celebrities were frequently featured. Among the first frequently parodied persons in the magazine columns, was the young playwright Henrik Ibsen. He strongly disliked being a subject of rumors. To keep the writers' identity hidden, editorial meetings were held in secret at a back room of Jacob L'Orsas Café. The first illustrator was August Schneider, who designed the magazine's first title vignette in 1862, and further was member of the editorial council. He was many years later followed by the likes of Olaf Krohn, Andreas Bloch, Gustav Lærum and Olaf Gulbransson.

The magazine ceased publication in 1947.

References

1862 establishments in Norway
1947 disestablishments in Norway
Defunct magazines published in Norway
Magazines established in 1862
Magazines disestablished in 1947
Magazines published in Oslo
Satirical magazines published in Norway
Weekly magazines published in Norway
Norwegian-language magazines